Three different xenon fluorides, all exergonic and stable, are known:

Xenon difluoride, XeF2
Xenon tetrafluoride, XeF4
Xenon hexafluoride, XeF6